Of Wee Sweetie Mice and Men is the second novel of the Dan Starkey series by Northern Irish author, Colin Bateman, released on 25 April 1996 through HarperCollins. The name of the novel is a reference to the John Steinbeck novella Of Mice and Men.

Plot
Protagonist Dan Starkey is tasked with writing a book about "Bobby Fat Boy McMaster", the current heavyweight champion of Ireland, in his upcoming championship fight with Mike Tyson on St. Patrick's Day. When McMaster's wife is kidnapped, Starkey must figure out who's behind it before the varied and numerous factions that McMaster has offended, in his short time in New York, catch up with them.

Reception

The novel received generally positive acclaim, with reviewers praising the novels humour while noting that it is not of the same quality as the previous Starkey novel, Divorcing Jack.

Publishers Weekly stated that the novel is "not as tight and focused as Bateman's previous work" and notes that the novel "reflects a distinct political and religious bias, which will surprise readers who appreciated Starkey's earlier, more tongue-in-cheek approach to Northern Ireland sectarianism". They did, however, also state that: "nevertheless, Bateman delivers the kind of humour and sense of the ridiculous that his fans will relish". Kirkus Reviews took a similar stance, stating that the novel is "more relaxed and less wildly funny than Divorcing Jack or Cycle of Violence – but then that's what you'd expect when the brutality is only a game".

References

External links

Novels from Northern Ireland
Novels set in Northern Ireland
Novels by Colin Bateman
1996 British novels
British crime novels
HarperCollins books
Arcade Publishing books